An  was an artist who was officially appointed by the Imperial Household Agency of Japan to create works of art for the Tokyo Imperial Palace and other imperial residences.

History 
The system came into being during the Meiji period in 1890 and was discontinued after the end of World War II. From 1890 to 1944, seventy-nine individuals were appointed to the position, from both the fine and decorative arts. These tended to be artists who had already had a long and distinguished career. The programme was created to promote Japanese art, inspire new generations of artists, and preserve old techniques.

Imperial Household Artists received 100 yen each year. They were expected to submit one example of their work on being appointed and to accept commissions from the Imperial Household Agency. Some of the works commissioned were for presentation to foreign dignitaries. Many presentation wares were commissioned and then put into storage, to be gifted when the need came. Often these wares would bear the Imperial crest, a sixteen-petalled chrysanthemum.

In 1912, all twenty-four of the current artists were commissioned to create gifts for the Meiji Emperor to celebrate his 61st birthday. The Emperor died before the presentation could take place, so the items were placed in the Imperial Household Museum, which later became the Tokyo National Museum.

Most pieces of work cannot be seen in public except for some in the Museum of the Imperial Collections, as well as pieces in the Kiyomizu Sannenzaka Museum (ja), the Tokyo National Museum and the Khalili Collection of Japanese Art.

Important artists are still designated and protected by the government under the system of Living National Treasures.

List of artists

References 

 http://www.japantimes.co.jp/culture/2013/11/27/arts/the-imperial-household-of-tradition/

Sources 
 

 

1890 establishments in Japan
1947 disestablishments in Japan